Montour may refer to:

Places in the United States
 Montour, Iowa
 Montour, New York
 Montour Falls, New York
 Montour County, Pennsylvania
 Montour Lake, in Montour County, Pennsylvania
 Montour Run, a tributary of Fishing Creek in Columbia County, Pennsylvania
 Montour Township, Columbia County, Pennsylvania
 Montour Trail, a rail trail near Pittsburgh, Pennsylvania
 Montour School District, near Pittsburgh, Pennsylvania
 Montour High School, in the above school district
 Montour Railroad, a railroad in Pennsylvania

People
 Andrew Montour
 Brandon Montour
 Catharine Montour
 Madame Montour
 Nicholas Montour